A one-cent coin or one-cent piece is a small-value coin minted for various decimal currencies using the cent as their hundredth subdivision.

Examples include:
 the United States one-cent coin, better known as the US penny
 the Canadian one-cent piece, better known as the Canadian penny
 the Australian one-cent coin
 the New Zealand one-cent coin
 the Hong Kong one-cent coin
 the Singapore one-cent coin
 the Brunei one-cent coin
 the one-cent coin of the decimal Dutch guilder (Netherlands)
 the 1 cent euro coin used in several European countries known as the eurozone
 the one-cent coin of the South African rand

See also

 Cent (currency)
 Penny
 :Category:One-cent coins